Dragan Todorić (born July 27, 1954), is a Serbian former professional basketball player and current adviser to the President of Partizan Belgrade. He is known for a rare achievement: taking part, as a player and later as a part of the management, in winning of all 45 trophies in Partizan Belgrade history.

Club playing career
In 1967, Todorić started his playing career in Sloga from his hometown Kraljevo. While competing for young Yugoslav national team he drew attention from several Yugoslav top clubs, including Partizan fierce rivals, Crvena zvezda. Eventually, he chose to sign for Partizan in 1972, and remained in the first team until 1983. During this period he played 363 official games, which puts him at 6th place of Partizan hall of fame list by number of played games. Before finishing his career in 1985, he played for OKK Belgrade (known as OKK Beko at the time) and again for Sloga. As Partizan player he won three state championships (in 1976, 1979 and 1981) one Yugoslav Cup (1979) and two Korać Cups (1978 and 1979).

National team career
Todorić represented Yugoslavia at the cadet, junior, and senior (full squad) level.

At age 15, just before his 16th birthday, he was part of the team that won gold at the 1971 European Championship for Cadets in Gorizia, Italy, playing alongside future legends Dragan Kićanović, Mirza Delibašić and Rajko Žižić. He was also on the squad that won gold at the 1972 European Championship for Juniors in Zadar.

On senior level, Todorić was overshadowed by famous point guard Zoran Slavnić; however, he still got to win gold medal at the 1975 Mediterranean Games in Algeria, and another gold medal on Balkan Championship in Romania, the same year.

Post playing career
Starting in 1982, while still an active player with Partizan, Todorić got a position at the club's marketing department. He has been at the club ever since in various coaching and administrative roles — assistant coach, secretary, general secretary, and director. Currently, he is Partizan's sporting director as well as a member of its board of directors.

Titles
Partizan
 Korać Cup: 1977-78, 1978–79
 Yugoslav Championship: 1975–76, 1978–79, 1980–81
 Yugoslav Cup: 1979

References

External links
 Profile on official Partizan website
 An article for official Euroleague website

1954 births
Living people
KK Partizan players
KK Sloga players
OKK Beograd players
Sportspeople from Kraljevo
Serbian men's basketball players
Serbian basketball executives and administrators
Yugoslav men's basketball players
Mediterranean Games gold medalists for Yugoslavia
Competitors at the 1975 Mediterranean Games
Mediterranean Games medalists in basketball
Point guards